Chen Pixian (March 20, 1916 – August 23, 1995) was a Chinese Communist revolutionary and politician. He served in several prominent roles, including party chief of Shanghai and party chief of Hubei province. He was purged at the beginning of the Cultural Revolution but was later rehabilitated.

Biography
Chen Pixian was born in Shanghang County, Fujian in 1916. He joined the Communist Party of China in 1931.

After the People's Republic of China was founded, Chen was the head of the party organization in Shanghai from 1965 to 1967. In 1967, Chen was ousted from power during the January Storm by radical elements led by Zhang Chunqiao. Chen spent much of the Cultural Revolution in solitary confinement. He wrote to Mao to resume his work, to no avail. Eventually Deng Xiaoping recalled Chen back to work on the pretext of medical treatment, and Chen was given the job of vice chairman of the Shanghai Revolutionary Committee. After the Cultural Revolution he served as party chief of Hubei.

He became a Secretary of the Secretariat of the CPC Central Committee in 1982, and was the Secretary of the CPC Central Political and Legislative Affairs Committee from 1982 to 1985.

Chen died in 1995, aged 89. He was eulogized with standard honours bestowed to high-ranking members of the Communist Party.

External links
 Biography of Chen Pixian 

1916 births
1995 deaths
People's Republic of China politicians from Fujian
Politicians from Longyan
Political office-holders in Shanghai
Governors of Hubei
Members of the Secretariat of the Chinese Communist Party
Chinese politicians of Hakka descent
Chinese Communist Party politicians from Fujian
Secretaries of the Communist Party Shanghai Committee
Vice Chairpersons of the National People's Congress